Eliza Happy Morton (15 July 1852 – 1916) was an American author and educator from the U.S. state of Maine. She is remembered for her geography textbooks.

Early years and education
Morton was born in Westbrook, Maine, 15 July 1852, the only daughter of William and Hannah Eliza Morton. Her parents were teachers in their earlier years, and she followed in that field. She was educated in Westbrook Seminary and began to teach at the age of 16.

Career
While teaching, Morton was impressed with the fact that many of the old methods of instruction were not productive of the best results, and she began at once to write articles for educational journals, advocating reforms, at the same time putting into practice the principles she advanced and securing results in her work. She taught in various parts of Maine. Her first article for the press was a prose sketch entitled "The Study of Geography."

In 1879, she was asked to be in charge of geographical science in Battle Creek College, Michigan. The idea of preparing a series of geographies gradually assumed shape in her mind, while her name was constantly appearing in print in publications east and west. In 1880, she published a volume of verse entitled "Still Waters" (Portland, Maine), which was well received. Many of her best poetical productions were written afterwards. She was also known as a writer of hymns noted for their religious fervor. They were set to music by composers, and the evangelist, Dwight L. Moody, used many of them in his revival work. Among those published in sheet form, the most popular were "The Songs My Mother Sang" and "In the Cleft of the Rock." After three years of earnest work in Battle Creek College, Morton withdrew and began to gather material for her geographies. Hundreds of books were examined, leading schools were visited and prominent educators in America and Europe were interviewed as to the best methods of teaching the science. In 1888, her "Elementary Geography" was completed. It was published in Philadelphia as "Potters' New Elementary Geography, by Eliza H. Morton." It had a wide sale, and an immediate call was made for an advanced book, which was written under the pressure of poor health, but with care and research. The higher book was also successful. As a practical educational reformer, Morton won public esteem. Her home was in North Deering, Maine. From 1894 to 1911, she served as business manager, secretary and treasurer of the Maine Tract Society, the Maine branch of Review and Herald Publishing Association of Washington, D.C.

Morton was interested in missionary and sunshine work, and in philanthropic work for children. She was a member of the National Geographic Society and International Sunshine Society. Her religious affiliation was as a Seventh-day Adventist.

Selected works

 1893, Geographical spice; a manual for the use of teachers
 1888, Potter's new elementary geography
 1895, Chalk illustrations for geography classes, a manual for teachers to accompany any series of geographies
 1895, Potter's advanced geography : mathematical, physical and political
 1895, Hints to church librarians : a handbook of practical instruction
 1900, Morton's elementary geography
 1901, Lessons on the continents
 1901, Morton's advanced geography
 1905, Thought, its origin and power
 1905, Still waters, or, Dreams of rest : a collection of sacred poems
 1924, Rays of light on the Sabbath question

References

Attribution

Bibliography

External links

1852 births
1916 deaths
People from Westbrook, Maine
19th-century American women writers
19th-century American writers
American non-fiction writers
Educators from Maine
Year of death unknown
American women educators
American Christian hymnwriters
Westbrook College alumni
American women hymnwriters
American women non-fiction writers
Wikipedia articles incorporating text from A Woman of the Century
19th-century American women musicians